Cacopsylla melanoneura is an insect of the Psyllidae family. It mainly feeds on Hawthorn. The insect will also feed on apple trees and is considered the main vector of the phytoplasma disease "Ca. Phytoplasma mali" (Apple Proliferation) in northwestern Italy.

References 

Psyllidae
Insect vectors of plant pathogens
Insects described in 1848
Hemiptera of Europe